Derbyshire County Cricket Club in 2010 was the cricket season when the English club Derbyshire had been playing for one hundred and thirty-nine years. They were in the second division in the County Championship, where they finished  ninth. Two new competitions were introduced for the season. These were the  Clydesdale Bank 40 and the  Friends Provident t20. These replaced the Pro40 League, the Friends Provident Trophy and the Twenty20  competitions. Derbyshire was in Group B in the Clydesdale Bank 40 and in the North Group of the Friends Provident t20 but did not progress to the knockout stage in either competition.

2010 season

In the 2010 County Championship, Derbyshire was in Division 2 and finished in ninth position. Of their sixteen games, they won three and lost seven, the remainder being drawn. Another first class fixture against Loughborough University was abandoned. In the 2010 Clydesdale Bank 40, Derbyshire was in Group B in which they  won four of their twelve matches to finish fourth in the group. In the 2010 Friends Provident t20, Derbyshire played in the North Group and won six of their sixteen matches to finish fifth in the group.

Greg Smith was captain. Chris Rogers scored most runs and Robin Peterson took most wickets

Matches

First Class

Clydesdale Bank 40

Friends Provident T20

Statistics

Competition batting averages

As the Loughborough University match was cancelled, figures for first-class and the County Championship are the same.

Competition bowling averages

Wicket Keeping
Stephen Adshead 
County Championship  Catches  13, Stumping  0  
Clydesdale Bank 40  Catches 6, Stumping 1  
Thomas Poynton 
County Championship  Catches  5, Stumping  0  
Lee Goddard 
County Championship  Catches 24, Stumping 0
Clydesdale Bank 40  Catches 1, Stumping 0
Friends Provident T20 Catches 5, Stumping 1

See also
Derbyshire County Cricket Club seasons
2010 English cricket season

References

2010 in English cricket
Derbyshire County Cricket Club seasons